The Pondoland fig (Ficus bizanae) is a species of fig that is endemic to forests of coastal South Africa, where it is threatened by habitat loss.

Their figs are borne on old wood, in small clusters on stumpy branchlets. Their leaves have entire margins, usually have rounded bases, and sometimes have acuminate tips. It is pollinated by Courtella wasps.

The Heart-leaved fig, Ficus polita, is a similar forest species, but is distributed towards the north.

References

bizanae
Endemic flora of South Africa
Trees of South Africa
Vulnerable flora of Africa
Taxonomy articles created by Polbot